The Piptocephalidaceae are a family of fungi in the Zoopagales order. The family contain contains 3 genera, and 70 species.

 Kuzuhaea (1 sp.) haustorial parasite of fungi (mostly of Mucorales spp.)
 Piptocephalis (25 spp.) haustorial parasite of fungi (mostly of Mucorales spp.)
 Syncephalis (61 spp.) haustorial parasite of fungi (mostly of Mortierellales and Mucorales spp.)

References

External links

Zygomycota
Parasitic fungi
Parasites of fungi
Taxa named by Joseph Schröter
Fungus families